Faith is a town in Rowan County, North Carolina, United States, incorporated in 1903. The population was 807 at the 2010 census.

Since 1946, the town has hosted a Fourth of July celebration that has become notably large for a town of its population – running for several days and drawing visitors from many states. The Faith Fourth achieved national visibility in 1992, when President George H. W. Bush not only made a speech praising small town virtues, but also participated in the traditional Fourth of July softball game.

History
Shuping's Mill Complex was listed on the National Register of Historic Places in 1982.

Historian and sociologist James W. Loewen has identified Faith as one of several possible sundown towns in North Carolina.

Geography
Faith is located at  (35.586803, −80.461162).

Demographics

2020 census

As of the 2020 United States census, there were 819 people, 309 households, and 222 families residing in the town.

2000 census
As of the census of 2000, there were 695 people, 276 households, and 210 families residing in the town. The population density was 710.2 people per square mile (273.8/km2). There were 308 housing units at an average density of 314.7 per square mile (121.3/km2). The racial makeup of the town was 95.83% White, 3.17% African American, 0.14% Asian, and 0.86% from two or more races. Hispanic or Latino of any race were 0.14% of the population.

There were 276 households, out of which 31.5% had children under the age of 18 living with them, 62.3% were married couples living together, 9.1% had a female householder with no husband present, and 23.6% were non-families. 20.3% of all households were made up of individuals, and 9.4% had someone living alone who was 65 years of age or older. The average household size was 2.52 and the average family size was 2.88.

In the town, the population was spread out, with 23.5% under the age of 18, 7.5% from 18 to 24, 31.7% from 25 to 44, 22.0% from 45 to 64, and 15.4% who were 65 years of age or older. The median age was 37 years. For every 100 females, there were 98.6 males. For every 100 females age 18 and over, there were 93.5 males.

The median income for a household in the town was $41,875, and the median income for a family was $47,969. Males had a median income of $32,303 versus $24,559 for females. The per capita income for the town was $18,207. About 6.5% of families and 6.6% of the population were below the poverty line, including 10.2% of those under age 18 and 8.5% of those age 65 or over.

References

External links
 Official town website 
Remarks of President George Bush in Faith, July 4, 1992
 Activities of U.S. Presidents on the Fourth of July

Towns in Rowan County, North Carolina
Towns in North Carolina
Populated places established in 1903
1903 establishments in North Carolina